Darren Bolden (born 28 February 1963) is a former Australian rules footballer who played for Fitzroy in the Victorian Football League (VFL) in 1986.  He was recruited from the South Warrnambool Football Club in the Hampden Football League.

References

External links

Living people
1963 births
Fitzroy Football Club players
South Warrnambool Football Club players
Australian rules footballers from Victoria (Australia)